
Year 97 BC was a year of the pre-Julian Roman calendar. At the time it was known as the Year of the Consulship of Lentulus and Crassus (or, less frequently, year 657 Ab urbe condita) and the Fourth Year of Tianhan. The denomination 97 BC for this year has been used since the early medieval period, when the Anno Domini calendar era became the prevalent method in Europe for naming years.

Events 
 By place 

 Roman Republic 
 Consuls: Gnaeus Cornelius Lentulus and Publius Licinius Crassus.
 C. Decianus, the prosecutor of Furius, is himself condemned for his remarks about the death of Saturninus.
 The Romans subdue the Maedi and Dardani.
 L. Domitius takes harsh measures to restore order in Sicily.
 The censors, Flaccus and Antonius, remove M. Duronius from the senate because of his opposition to sumptuary laws.
 A decree of the Roman Senate bans human sacrifices.
 Sulla displays a lion hunt for the first time in games at Rome.

 Asia Minor 
 Ariarathes VIII is forced out of Cappadocia by Mithridates, and dies soon afterwards.

 China 
 The Han generals Li Guangli, Gongsun Ao, Han Yue and Lu Bode lead armies into Xiongnu territory. The campaign achieves little, and Gongsun Ao suffers a defeat. Emperor Wu of Han condemns him to death, but he escapes by feigning his death. He is eventually discovered and executed during the witchcraft trials of 91 BC.

 Japan 
 Sujin becomes emperor of Japan (approximate date).

 By topic 

 Religion 
 Joseph, the husband of Mary the mother of Jesus, and his "earthly-father" - in distinction to God the Father, his "heavenly father" - is born.  According to some accounts, Joseph was 92 years old when Jesus was born.

Births 
Appius Claudius Pulcher, Roman consul (d. 49 BC)

Deaths

References